Manzoor Alam Beg (1 October 193126 July 1998) was a Bangladeshi photographer. He was awarded Ekushey Padak in 2007 by the Government of Bangladesh.

Personal life
Beg was the third child of  Professor Husam Uddin Beg (from Murshidabad of West Bengal), and Zaheda Chowdhury (from Rajshahi of East Bengal). Professor Husam Uddin Beg was the Principal of B M College in Barisal. Beg married Walida Chowdhury on 17 March 1963. They had three children: photographer Iftekhar Alam Beg, photographer Imtiaz Alam Beg, and Ishtiaque Alam Beg. Beg's eldest brother Mahmood Alam Beg was the Deputy Governor of Bangladesh Bank, which is the central bank of Bangladesh. His younger brother Captain Mahfuz Alam Beg was the Sub-sector Commander of Sector 9 in the independence war of Bangladesh in 1971.

Training and education 
Beg received photographic training at the Technical Training Centre of the Pakistan Air Force in Karachi in 1949. UNESCO training on microfilming in Karachi (1957). British government training on document reproduction at Hatfield College of Technology in UK (1968). Kodak Colour Film course at Kodak Photographic School at Harrow in London (1968). Diploma in photography from the British Institute of Reprographic Technology (1976). A training course for information centre managers organised by UNESCO and the Government of India in New Delhi (1980).

Career
Beg set up of the Begart Institute of Photography in 1960, the nation's first training facility for photography. In 1976, he founded the Bangladesh Photographic Society. He was well known for organising photographers and photographic activities in a place that had practically no recent history of institutional or professional photography. Manzoor Alam Beg was honoured as ESFIAP at the FIAP (the distinction "Excellence for Services Rendered" is awarded to those persons who have accomplished exceptional services over a long period for the benefit of The International Federation of Photographic Art) 19th Congress in Germany, 1987. He was honored with a title Aalokchitracharjo (The Chancellor of Photography) by BPS on behalf of Bangladeshi photographers community. He is considered as the Father of Fine Art Photography Movements in Bangladesh. Aalokchitracharjo (The Chancellor of Photography) Manzoor Alam Beg has been awarded the most prestigious Ekushey Podak given by Bangladesh government in 2007 besides 200 more national and international awards and honors.

Death
Beg died on 26 July 1998.

Professional careers 
Beg served in following organizations.
 United States Information Services (USIS), Dhaka 1955 – 1957.
 PANSDOC National Documentation Centre, Karachi 1957 – 1960.
 Bangladesh National Scientific and Technical Documentation Centre BANSDOC Dhaka 1963 – 1988.

Books on photography 
 Report on photography, Published in UK, 1968.
 Adhunik Photography, Published in India, 1974.
 Photography Formula, 1974.
 Adhunik Photography (Modern Photography), 1974
 Photography Digest, 1981.
 Rangin Photo Printing, 1985.
 Microfilm ki o kano, 1991.
 Alokchitron shadakalo o Rangin, 1993.
 Darkroom Solution, 1994.

Honours 
 Honorary Fellow of the Bangladesh Photographic Society, 1983.
 Honorary life membership of WIF (Worldview International Foundations), 1982.
 Hon FPAD (The highest honour in photography) India, 1982.
 CINE-SEEK PODAK by the Cine – Seek Audio- visual club Dhaka, 1986.
 Awarded ASIIPC by the India International Photographic Council, 1991.
 FSIPC by the India International Photographic Council (IIPC), 1997.
 Photography Charcha honour at Calcutta Book Fair 1997.
 Alokchitracharjo (Chancellor of Photography) by the Bangladesh Photographic Society, 1998 .

Awards

 The Cento Photo Contest Prize (Bronze) Ankara, 1968
 ACCU UNESCO Prize, Japan, 1976
 Hon Diploma, USSR, 1977
 ACCU Rotary Prize, Japan, 1977
 Two Hon Mention Prizes, Canada, 1977
 First Prize Photo kina, Germany, 1978
 First Prize, Pentax, Uk, 1986
 First prize World and I, USA, 1986
 First prize World and I, USA, 1987
 Ekushey Padak (2007)

References

Bangladeshi photographers
Bangladeshi male writers
Recipients of the Ekushey Padak in arts
1931 births
1998 deaths